Charleville-Mézières is a commune of northern France, capital of the Ardennes department, Grand Est.
Charleville-Mézières is located on the banks of the river Meuse.

History

Charleville was founded by Charles Gonzaga, the 8th duke of Mantua, in 1606. Its inhabitants were known as Carolopolitans ( or Carolopolitaines). It was prosperous from the 17th century, although its fortifications were dismantled under LouisXIV in 1687 and it passed into French hands in 1708. It was plundered by the Prussians in 1815. France's royal armaments factory was formerly located there and gave its name to the Charleville musket, before being relocated and divided between Tulle and Châtellerault. In the 19th century, the city continued to produce arms through private firms, as well as nails, hardware, wine, spirits, coal, iron, and slate. It boasted a spacious port, a theatre, a large public library, and a museum of natural history.

The inhabitants of Mézières were known as Macerians ( or Macériennes).

By the mid-19th century, the two towns were linked by a suspension bridge. It was occupied by the German Empire in the First World War and by Nazi Germany in World War II - the town served as the center of the Oberste Heeresleitung (OHL) for 26 days during World War I. The present commune was established in 1966, the year after another commune, Le Theux, had been merged into Mézières. The entire resultant commune has a population of about 51,000.

Climate

With an annual average of 9 °C (48,1 °F), Charleville-Mézières is generally the coolest city of France. Winters are long, cold and gloomy while summers are hot enough but sometimes, even in the middle of July, night temperatures can drop below 5 °C (41 °F). Under the Köppen-Geiger climate classification, Charleville-Mézières features a temperate oceanic climate (Cfb) with strong continental influences (Dfb).

Population

In the table and graph below, data for 1962 and earlier refer to the old commune of Charleville, before the merger with Étion, Mézières, Mohon and Montcy-Saint-Pierre.

Culture
Puppetry is an important part of the cultural life of Charleville-Mézières, which is called the "World Capital of Puppetry Arts". An international puppet festival has been held there every three years since 1961, and became a biennial event in 2011. The town is also home to the world headquarters of UNIMA as well as the International Puppetry Institute (French: Institut International de la Marionnette), which is housed in a historic building featuring a giant automaton of a puppeteer who performs a puppet show every hour on the hour. The École Nationale Supérieure des Arts de la Marionnette (ESNAM), a college which offers a higher education in puppetry, is also situated in Charleville-Mézières.

The poet Arthur Rimbaud (1854–1891) was born in Charleville. The  is located in the old water mill (Le Vieux Moulin) to the north of the town.

Transport
The local network of public buses within the Ardenne Métropole, TAC, is operated by RATP Dev. The Charleville-Mézières railway station offers connections to Paris (by TGV), Reims, Lille, Metz and regional destinations.

Sport
OFC Charleville represent the town at association football. Étoile de Charleville-Mézières is a basketball club.

Famous residents

 Louise Bellocq (1919–1968), French writer, winner of the 1960 Prix Femina, was born in Charleville
 Olivier Brochard (born 1967), former football player
 Antoine Louis Dugès (1797–1838), obstetrician and naturalist
 François Habeneck (1781–1849), violinist born in Mézières
 Adolphe-Hippolyte Couveley (1802–1867), painter born in Charleville
 Edmond Louis Alexis Dubois-Crancé (1747–1814), general, French revolutionary, minister of war, 12th President of the National Convention.
 Louis Dufour (1652–1733), the abbé of Longuerue, was born in Charleville.
 Jean Nicolas Pierre Hachette (1769–1834), mathematician born in Mézières.
 Henri Mialaret (1855–1919), sailor
 Gaspard Monge (1746–1818), mathematician, taught at the École royale du génie de Mézières.
 Étienne Riché (1883–1934), politician and banker, twice under-secretary of state and deputy for the Ardennes, born in Charleville
 Arthur Rimbaud (1854–1891), the French poet, was born in Charleville.
 Félix Savart (1791–1841), physicist and mathematician born in Mézières
 Louis Tirman (1837–1899), lawyer and civil servant, Governor General of Algeria from 1881 to 1891
 Natalis de Wailly (1805–1886), 19th-century historian and palaeographer born in Charleville

International relations
Charleville-Mézières is twinned with:

 Dülmen, Germany
 Euskirchen, Germany
 Nordhausen, Germany
 Nevers, France
 Mantua, Italy
 Tolosa, Spain

See also
 Pierre Terrail, seigneur de Bayard
 Clément-Bayard
Communes of the Ardennes department

Notes

References

External links

 

Communes of Ardennes (department)
Prefectures in France
Champagne (province)
Ardennes communes articles needing translation from French Wikipedia